Untergriesbach is a municipality in the district of Passau in Bavaria in Germany.

Geography 
Untergriesbach is located in the southern Bavarian Forest and extends high above the deep valley of the Danube. The height of the market town is 565 meters above sea level. Via the Bundesstraße 388 it is connected  to Passau (22 km) and in the opposite direction to the Upper Austrian Haslach (32 km).

History 
The name comes from the nobles of Griesbach. These were a rich noble family with numerous possessions in the "land of the Abbey" (Passauer Abbey Country). Nothing remains from the former castle.

Originally it was named "Griespach", then "Griesbach on high market" (to distinguish it from "Griesbach in the cell" = Obernzell) and finally renamed in 1806 to Untergriesbach (to distinguish it from Bad Griesbach in the Rott Valley).

The nobles of Griesbach died out in the early 13th century. Their successors were the Wessenberger who possessed an extended property as a fief of the Bishopric Passau. The castle was probably destroyed after the death of the last Wessenberger around 1240.

1260 Bishop Otto of Lonsdorf (approx. 1200–1265) gave the rights to hold a market and other privileges. During the Passau citizens revolt against Bishop Albert III. von Winkel (died 1380) Untergriesbach was burned down 1367 by insurgents from Passau. In 1456 Bishop Ulrich of Nussdorf confirmed and extended the rights and freedoms of the market.

Untergriesbach was largely spared from Thirty Years' War, but the Bavarian and Imperial troops, who were billeted here, imported in 1648 the plague during the last year of the war, which raged until early 1650 with great violence.

The late Gothic parish church of St. Michael was remodeled baroque in several stages during the 18th century. In 1803 the market Griesbach came to Ferdinand III, Grand Duke of Tuscany (1769–1824) and 1806 to Kingdom of Bavaria. The trader Georg Saxinger was elected the first mayor. 1829 a new school building was erected, from 1829 to 1830 was built a new road to Obernzell, which was much more comfortable to drive than the old mountain road.

In 1903 the name of the municipality Griesbach was officially changed to Untergriesbach.
1956 was built in the area of the municipality the water power plant Jochenstein.

Municipality arrangement 
Untergriesbach has 106 districts:

Bachhäusl
Berghof
Brunnreut
Dienberg
Diendorf
Dürrmühle
Eck
Eckersäg
Eckerstampf
Eckmühle
Endsfelden
Feldhäuslhäusl
Ficht
Fichtwiesen
Friedlgrub
Gammertshof
Gebrechtshof
Gebrechtsmühle
Glotzing
Gotting
Gottsdorf
Grögöd
Grub
Grunau
Habersdorf
Hamet
Hanzing
Hastorf
Haunersdorf
Herrenwies
Hinterkühberg
Hintersäg
Hitzing
Hochreut
Hochwiesl
Höhenberg
Holzhäusl
Hubing
Hundsruck
Jochenstein
Kagerreut
Kappelgarten
Kinzesberg
Knapphäusl
Knittlmühle
Kohlbachmühle
Kroding
Kronawitten
Kronawitthof
Krottenthal
Kühberg
Lämersdorf
Leizesberg
Linden
Lindlmühle
Mairau
Mittereck
Mitterreut
Nebling
Neureuth
Niederdorf
Oberöd
Oberötzdorf
Oberreut
Ochsenreut
Ornatsöd
Paulusberg
Pfaffenreut
Priel
Ramesberg
Rampersdorf
Ratzing
Rechab
Reut
Richtermühle
Riedl
Riedlerhof
Roll
Rothkreuz
Saxing
Schaibing
Schergendorf
Scherleinsöd
Schreinerhäusl
Spechting
Sperrhäusl
Steinbruck
Steinbüchl
Stollberg
Stollbergmühle
Tabakstampf
Taubing
Untergriesbach
Unteröd
Unterötzdorf
Unterreut
Vorholz
Waldfriede
Weidwies
Wesseslinden
Willersdorf
Würm
Würmmühle
Zaunbrechl
Ziering
Zipf

Incorporations 
On 1 October 1971, the previously independent municipality Lambsdorf was incorporated. On 1 January 1972 Gottsdorf and Schaibing were added. Oberötzdorf followed on 1 March 1972.

Transport 
A railway terminal was built in 1904 in Schaibing, located at the Passau-Hauzenberg railway. On this route the passenger transport ended in 1970, the freight transport ended in 1997. There are efforts to reactivate this route.

In 1912 Untergriesbach got connected to the Passau–Hauzenberg railway by a Rack railway. Rail traffic ceased in 1965, in 1975 the track Obernzell-Wegscheid was removed.

Town council 

The town council has been elected in the local elections on 2 March 2008 as follows:
CSU: 7 seats (36.3% of votes)
Freie Wähler Bayern: 6 seats (27.6% of votes)
Christian Electoral Community: 4 seats (22.4% of votes)
SPD: 3 seats (13.7% of votes)

Crest 
Blazon: "Argent, a left-facing rising red wolf."

Educational institutions 
Kindergarten
Primary and secondary school
Gymnasium Untergriesbach

Culture 
Twinned city is Civezzano (Trentino, Italy)
A festival is held every three years in the second weekend in July in conjunction with the local history days (Heimattage).

Attractions 
St Michael, late gothic parish church, refurbished in the 18th in the baroque style
Village chapel, built from 1765 to 1768
Parish Church of St. Jakob (Elder) in Gottsdorf
Pillory from 1490 as a sign of the former low jurisdiction of the market

Ruins Castle Altjochenstein and Castle Neujochenstein

People from Untergriesbach 
 Christian Goller  (born 1943 in Untergriesbach), German painter and art restorer
 Ottfried Fischer (born 1953 in Ornatsöd), actor and kabarett artist
 Theoderich Hagn (born 23. March 1816 in Untergriesbach), Abbot of Lambach
 Friedrich Oberneder (born 25 September 1891 in Pölzöd), theologian and poet
 Rudolf Wimmer (born 10 April 1849 in Gottsdorf), painter

Sports and teams 
 The largest association of the town is the sports-club SV Untergriesbach with approximately 850 members.
 The veterans of the world wars, former and active soldiers of the Bundeswehr are organized in the soldiers and veterans associations in Untergriesbach, Schaibing and Gottsorf respectively.

References 

Passau (district)
Municipalities in Bavaria
Populated places on the Danube